The enzyme acetylenecarboxylate hydratase catalyzes the chemical reaction

3-oxopropanoate  propynoate + H2O

This enzyme belongs to the family of lyases, specifically the hydro-lyases, which cleave carbon-oxygen bonds.  The systematic name of this enzyme class is 3-oxopropanoate hydro-lyase (propynoate-forming). Other names in common use include acetylenemonocarboxylate hydratase, alkynoate hydratase, acetylenemonocarboxylate hydrase, acetylenemonocarboxylic acid hydrase, malonate-semialdehyde dehydratase, and 3-oxopropanoate hydro-lyase.  This enzyme participates in 3 metabolic pathways: beta-alanine metabolism, propanoate metabolism, and butanoate metabolism.

References

 
 

EC 4.2.1
Enzymes of unknown structure